The Olympic Club of Washington, D.C., or Washington Olympics in modern nomenclature, was an early professional baseball team.

When the National Association of Base Ball Players permitted openly professional clubs for the 1869 season, the Olympics were one of twelve to go pro. Two years later they were a founding member of the first professional sports league, the National Association of Professional Base Ball Players (NAPBBP or NA, for short). The Olympics played home games at Olympics Grounds in Washington. They were founded by Nicholas Young, an outfielder who continued as non-playing business and field manager after 1870.

For 1871 the Olympics hired five players from the famous Cincinnati Red Stockings. The new Boston Red Stockings hired the other half including manager Harry Wright and his selection. With the name "Red Stockings" taken, local writers dubbed the Olympic club the "Blue Stockings". The Boston club lost a close pennant race while the Olympics were only mediocre. During their two league seasons they won 17 games and lost 22 for a winning percentage of .436.

See also
1871 Washington Olympics season
1872 Washington Olympics season

External links
Baseball Reference team index

 
National Association of Base Ball Players teams
Defunct National Association baseball teams
Sports clubs disestablished in 1872
1872 disestablishments in Washington, D.C.
Defunct baseball teams in Washington, D.C.
Baseball teams disestablished in 1872
Baseball teams established in 1869